White Juan is the unofficial name given to the hurricane-strength nor'easter blizzard of February 2004 that affected most of Atlantic Canada and the Eastern United States between February 17 and 20, 2004—five months after Hurricane Juan devastated Nova Scotia and Prince Edward Island.

Meteorological history
It intensified over the Gulf Stream, moving at 35–40 km/h (21–24 mi/h) before striking Atlantic Canada.

Impacts

The snowstorm dropped a record-breaking  of snow on CFB Shearwater, beating the previous record of  set February 1, 1960.

Much of central, northern and western New Brunswick received little to no snow or wind as the storm tracked toward the east.

Two weather stations in the Halifax Regional Municipality reported 10-second gusts nearing . However, these reports have never been confirmed by Environment Canada. Weather radar observations, as well as synoptic report, showed extensive thundersnow embedded within the blizzard; in the heaviest bands, accumulation rates exceeded .

The wind also whipped up snow drifts which in some cases covered two and three-storey buildings and made many roads impassable to both common motor vehicles and snow removal equipment.

The humid continental climate of coastal Nova Scotia typically does not experience extreme snowfalls, compared with northern Nova Scotia, Cape Breton Island, Prince Edward Island and New Brunswick. Thus the blizzard and heavy snowfall had a crippling effect on the Halifax Urban Area for several days following the storm as public works personnel struggled to clear streets and roads.  For several nights following the storm, a 10 p.m. curfew was implemented on residents in the Halifax Regional Municipality to permit operation of snow removal equipment. Due to a lack of space to displace the excess snow, the municipality had to receive permission from the federal government to begin dumping the snow into Halifax Harbour from federally owned docks in addition to the usual privately owned docks.

The storm also had an effect on the 2004 Special Olympic National Winter Games, which were being held in Charlottetown, PEI.

Snowfall amounts for February 18–19 

Halifax and Dartmouth: 
Yarmouth: 
Charlottetown: 
Halifax International Airport: 
Enfield: 
Moncton: 
Port Hawkesbury: 	
Baddeck: 
Sydney: 
Saint John: 	
Miramichi: 
Fredericton: 	
Bathurst:

School cancellations 
All schools were closed in Nova Scotia and Prince Edward Island as province-wide states of emergency were declared.

Marine effects 

While conditions on land proved to be serious, the storm produced hurricane-force winds out at sea with 10–15 meter (32–49 ft) swells, prompting a special marine warning. A storm surge equivalent to that associated with a Category 1 hurricane also affected portions of the Northumberland Strait in southeast New Brunswick and to a lesser extent Prince Edward Island.

Financial impacts
In 2011, the Halifax Regional Municipality announced that it had submitted bills to the federal government totalling $19.9 million in the wake of Hurricane Juan and White Juan, and that it was still waiting for nearly $6 million.

It wasn't until ten years later that the federal government announced that it would pay the province $3.6 million under the Disaster Financial Assistance Arrangements program which helps cover the costs of evacuations, emergency shelters and infrastructure.

See also

 North American blizzard of 2006
 Early February 2013 North American blizzard
 January 2018 North American blizzard

References

External links 
Environment Canada "White Juan"
"White Juan" photos from PEI
The Great Maritime Blizzard or ‘White Juan’

Blizzards in Canada
Nor'easters
2004 meteorology
2004 natural disasters
2004 in Canada
Natural disasters in Nova Scotia
Natural disasters in Prince Edward Island
Natural disasters in New Brunswick
Natural disasters in Newfoundland and Labrador
2004 disasters in Canada